Ebba Lövenskiold (born 7 October 1977) is a Swedish journalist and education activist. She has been covering film and entertainment for Swedish newspapers and magazines from New York City since 2008.

Together for Better 
She is the Founder of the Together for Better Foundation, a charity working for kid´s right to education. Through the foundation, Ebba builds and supports schools for underprivileged children in the Dominican Republic. Ebba started the project after having vacationed on the island when the devastating earthquake hit Haiti in 2010. The charity funded construction of three schools.

References

Living people
1977 births
Swedish journalists
Swedish activists
Swedish women activists
Education activists